The men's 1500 metres event at the 2010 Asian Games was held at the Aoti Main Stadium, Guangzhou, China on 22–23 November.

Schedule
All times are China Standard Time (UTC+08:00)

Records

Results

Round 1 
 Qualification: First 4 in each heat (Q) and the next 4 fastest (q) advance to the final.

Heat 1

Heat 2

Final

References

Results

Athletics at the 2010 Asian Games
2010